St Philip's Grammar School, in Hagley Road, Edgbaston, Birmingham, was a Roman Catholic state grammar school for boys. It was closed in 1976, but continued as a Sixth Form College until 1995.

History
St Philip's was founded when two priests of the Birmingham Oratory took over an existing Catholic Grammar School in 1887. It should not be confused with the Oratory School founded by John Henry Newman in 1859 and which later moved to Pangbourne, near Reading.

The school started in the Little Oratory on 19 September 1887 until the main building was completed on 13 December 1887. The longest-serving teacher in the school's history was Francis Thomas Leighton, who served as "Second Master" (Deputy Head) from 1911 until 1945, having served as Headmaster when the School was evacuated to Ludlow in 1941. His two sons, and later, grandson, also attended the school. FT Leighton finally left to found an independent Preparatory School, Leighton House School, serving as a "feeder" school for St Philip's. The school ceased to accept new entrants as a boys' Grammar School in 1976, while the 1975 cohort progressed through to 1980.

Sixth form college
It became St Philip's Roman Catholic Sixth Form College in 1976, with around 800 sixth formers. In October 1992, due to only 30% of the intake being Catholic, the board of governors unsuccessfully attempted to change it to an 11-16 boys' secondary school, resulting in the Hagley Road site closing in August 1995. It temporarily became a site of South Birmingham College from 1995 but was vacated in 2005. The main school buildings were demolished in the early months of 2012.

Notable alumni

Eamon Duffy, Professor of the History of Christianity at the University of Cambridge 
 Patrick Gallaher CBE, Chairman of North West Gas from 1974–82, and of Wales Gas Board from 1970–74, and President of the IGasE from 1977–78
Sir Francis Griffin, Director of the NEC from 1970–74, 1976–80
 John Jenkins, Ambassador to Iraq since 2009
 Paul Keenan, composer
 Alfred Knight VC, OBE served in WW1 and later at Ministry of Labour
 Squadron Leader Peter Latham, later Air Vice-Marshal, Station Commander of RAF Tengah from 1969–71
 Paul Francis Leighton, Broadcaster and BBC Radio 2 Newsreader, 1981-2000.
 Jim McCarthy, CEO of Poundland
 Don Maclean, entertainer and presenter of Crackerjack.
 Daniel Moylan, banker and Conservative politician
 Stephen Nash, swimmer
 Anthony E. Pratt, inventor of the board game Cluedo
 Terence Rigby, actor
 Francis Farrell, Musician (Supertramp) 
 William Slim - Between 1903 and 1910, William Slim attended St Phillip's and King Edward's. As Field Marshal Slim, he served as the British commander-in-chief in Southeast Asia during World War II.
 Joseph Spence, Master of Dulwich College
 J. R. R. Tolkien and his brother Hilary Tolkien: In 1902, the Tolkien family moved to a house in Edgbaston next door to the Birmingham Oratory and the school. Tolkien had been attending King Edward's School but was moved to St Philip's. Later, he won a Foundation Scholarship to King Edwards and returned to his former school.
 John Warnaby, Actor
 Lawrence Holder - CEO of Cathedral Capital and Member of the Council of Lloyds
 Gerard Tracey, archivist, writer, editor and scholar.
 Paul Crawford, Professor of Health Humanities, The University of Nottingham.
 Sir Simon Campbell, CBE, FRS, FMedSci, International Director of Research Pfizer, Signatory to patent of Viagra; Past President of the Royal Society of Chemistry; Visiting Professor at the Universities of Bristol and São Paulo, board of advisors Universities of Leeds and Kent; Consultant FAO

See also
 Saint Philip Neri
A History of St Philips, from Beginning to Beginning, Margaret Worsley, Wine Press, Tamworth, 1997,

References

External links
 Tolkien Trail
 
 Discussed in Parliament in October 1993

Grade II* listed buildings in the West Midlands (county)
Defunct schools in Birmingham, West Midlands
Boys' schools in the West Midlands (county)
Defunct grammar schools in England
Defunct Catholic schools in the Archdiocese of Birmingham
Educational institutions established in 1887
Educational institutions disestablished in 1976
1887 establishments in England
1976 disestablishments in England
Edgbaston